Wingu la moto (Lit: Cloud of Fire) is a drama and soap opera that premiered on  NTV in 2003 -2006. It depicted greed, deceit and forbidden relationships.

Cast
Nini Wacera   -Suzanne
Ken Ambani
Benta Ochieng
Esther Kahuha
Wanja Mworia

Kenya broadcast
Nation TV confirmed to air Wingu la moto from 2003. It was aired on Wednesday at 8PM. The series ended on 2006.

References

Kenyan television soap operas
2003 Kenyan television series debuts
2006 Kenyan television series endings
Swahili-language television shows
NTV (Kenyan TV channel) original programming